The Starting Line is composed of two program presentations, both of which are highly edited versions of shows that were originally broadcast on KPFA's Over the Edge radio show, hosted by Don Joyce weekly and featuring members of Negativland.  The first program, "The Starting Line," is Tracks 1-5, and features a mock call-in radio show focusing on various aspects of cars, hosted by a character (and used car dealer) named Dick Goodbody.  The second program, "The Rototiller Singalong," takes up Tracks 6 - 9, and is hosted by two people claiming not to be involved with Over the Edge, but are in fact David Wills & Richard Lyons.  The program features a recording of a Rototiller (as captured by David Wills when his neighbor was using it, which has become a bit of an inside-joke for fans of the show), and over-the-phone "karaoke," where callers provide the vocal parts for music being played in the studio.

Originally released in 1985 by SST Records on cassette only, it appeared as the Second Side of the JAMCON'84 cassette.  It was re-released in 1995 by Negativland's own label, Seeland Records, as a CD.  Given that JAMCON'84 had already been released, and with additional material, "The Rototiller Singalong," program was added to it.

Track listing
"The Drive Line: World's Most Beloved & Exalted Status Symbol, Metallic Root Beer, Lada, etc."
"Stir the Stumps: Answer Man, Hitler's Staff Car, Chappaquiddick, Transient Peaks, Carnuba Wax, etc."
"Receptacle Programming, Fear of Freeways Mix, Defend the Fuel, Total Asshole, etc."
"Auto Trivia: Cool Cars, Cheaper Cheese, Limousines of Pope Paul VII, etc."
"Chevy Innovation and JamJamJam"
"It Fell in Port Costa, Rototiller Mix, Bottlebrush Bushes, etc." [CD only]
"Phone-In Singalong, Song List, What the World Needs Now, Tammy, Drug Free, Transient Peaks, etc." [CD only]
"This Disco's Out of Sight, A Lot About Mucus, Sammy the Whammy, LIFE'S Unanswered Questions, No Other Possibility, etc." [CD only]
"Pure Full Stereo Rototiller and So Long" [CD only]

Personnel
The CD re-issue does not list personnel, but the SST Cassette release listed the following people participating in both JAMCON'84 & THE STARTING LINE:
Don Joyce
David Wills
Mark Hosler
Richard Lyons
Chris Grigg
Ian Allen
Anonymous callers

Given that OTE is Don's show, and that both Richard & David's voices host THE ROTOTILLER SINGALONG, we can assume that at least those three were involved with that Program.

Negativland albums
1995 compilation albums
SST Records compilation albums
Seeland Records compilation albums